The Women's 15 kilometre individual biathlon competition at the 2002 Winter Olympics was held on 11 February, at Soldier Hollow. Competitors raced over five loops of a 3.0 kilometre skiing course, shooting four times, twice prone and twice standing. Each miss resulted in one minute being added to a competitor's skiing time.

Results 

The Biathlon World Cup test event in 2001 was won by Magdalena Forsberg, who shot clear and won by more than a minute from Martina Zellner, a German who was not selected for her national team for the 2002 Games.
Forsberg was also the defending world champion and World Cup champion in the distance
, and led the World Cup in the discipline, having won two of the three Individual races earlier in the season. However despite a long history of success, she had never won an Olympic medal. Liv Grete Skjelbreid-Poirée won the other event of the season, at Antholz, while Ekaterina Dafovska was the defending Olympic champion.

The 25-year-old Andrea Henkel started before some of her more heralded competition, but recovered well after missing a shot on her second loop, making all ten of her remaining shots to add just the single minute to her ski time. Katrin Apel and Uschi Disl each beat Henkel's time going into the final shoot, despite missing shots earlier, but both missed three times on the final shoot, ending up outside the top 10. Olga Pyleva set the fastest times after the second and third shoots, leading Henkel by more than a minute, but sent two wide on the last shoot, and ended up 45 seconds behind the leading German. Defending champion Ekaterina Dafovska missed one shot in the race, like Henkel, but her ski speed wasn't enough to get close to a medal.

Liv Grete Skjelbreid-Poirée had an identical shooting line to Henkel, and while she was ahead of the German on the first two shoots, she fell behind on ski time, and ended up seven seconds back in second, well ahead of Pyleva, then in bronze position. The final serious challenge was from Magdalena Forsberg, who had won many World Championships, but did not have an Olympic medal. Forsberg was well over a minute clear of Henkel and Poirée as she approached the final shoot, but missed twice, losing any chance at gold. She did manage to get in for bronze, displacing Pyleva.

The race was started at 11:00.

References

Sports-Reference.com - Women's 15 km Individual

Women's biathlon at the 2002 Winter Olympics